Harttia fluminensis is a species of armored catfish where it is known only from the Coppename River drainage in Suriname.

References 

fluminensis
Taxa named by Raphaël Covain
Taxa named by Sonia Fisch-Muller
Fish described in 2012
Catfish of South America